"Faller du så faller jag" is a song written by Patrik Isaksson, and performed by himself at  Melodifestivalen 2006, where it was knocked out at the Second Chance Contest.

The single peaked at number 12 on the Swedish Singles Chart. On 23 April 2006, the song entered  Svensktoppen, where it ended up at number six. The three following weeks, the song fell down, only to be knocked out of chart the upcoming week.

During Melodifestivalen 2012, the song was one of the "Third Chance" entries.

Charts

References

External links

2006 singles
Melodifestivalen songs of 2006
Patrik Isaksson (singer) songs
Swedish-language songs
Sony Music singles
2006 songs